"I'll Stick Around" is the second single released by Foo Fighters from their 1995 self titled debut album Foo Fighters.

Background
The song's lyrics are about Courtney Love. "I don't think it's any secret that 'I'll Stick Around' is about Courtney," Dave Grohl said in 2009. "I've denied it for fifteen years, but I'm finally coming out and saying it. Just read the fucking words!"

The song has been labelled grunge, alternative rock, and power pop.

Music video
The video for this song was the first Foo Fighters music video and was directed by Jerry Casale, who was a member of and directed videos for Devo. Casale said he was chosen due to Devo's well-known surreal music videos, which would fit Grohl's request for a "non-video video", done for just $60,000. The video shows the band performing the song in a room with a paper background while lights strobe and a giant spore floats around them (the spore, described by Casale as "Foo Ball", was inspired by the foo fighter phenomenon that named the band, and its original conception was a "bloated, charred, inflated girl representing Courtney", but as Grohl's management vetoed the idea, it was replaced by an "3D HIV virus (sic) based on medical models from Scientific America (sic) magazine"). This is interspersed with footage of Dave Grohl eating chess pieces (an idea by the singer himself, done with "frame by frame stop-action animation") and brushing his teeth with what appears to be a switchblade.

The video also appeared in Beavis and Butthead.

Other versions

A live version recorded on May 25, 1997 at the Manchester Apollo was released as a B Side to the CD2 version of the Everlong single.
"Weird Al" Yankovic included "I'll Stick Around" in his polka medley "The Alternative Polka", from Bad Hair Day.

Personnel
Musicians on the album
 Dave Grohl – guitars, vocals, bass, drums
Musicians in the music video
Dave Grohl – guitar, vocals
Nate Mendel – bass
Pat Smear – guitar
William Goldsmith – drums

Track listings
UK promo CD/ US promo CD
 "I'll Stick Around"

7" Red Vinyl single / Cardsleeve CD Single
 "I'll Stick Around"
 "How I Miss You"

UK CD single/12" vinyl single
 "I'll Stick Around"
 "How I Miss You"
 "Ozone" (Ace Frehley cover)

Japanese CD Maxi-Single
 "I'll Stick Around"
 "How I Miss You"
 "Ozone" (Ace Frehley cover)
 "For All the Cows" (live at the Reading Festival, August 26, 1995)"
 "Wattershed" (live at the Reading Festival, August 26, 1995)"

Charts

References

1995 singles
Foo Fighters songs
Songs written by Dave Grohl
American power pop songs